The 2015 AFF Futsal Championship was the 12th edition of the tournament which was held in Thailand from 8 to 16 October 2015. This edition will also act as a qualification tournament for the 2016 AFC Futsal Championship.

A statement in June stated that Thailand and Australia were already assured of qualification to the 2016 AFC Championship, due to their positioning in the previous (2014) edition. This was later modified back so that those who reach the semi-finals shall qualify.

Singapore participated at the tournament after a 13-year absence, last participating at the inaugural edition in 2001.

Teams
The tournament was originally set to be hosted by Indonesia but the country's national football association was suspended by FIFA, barring the country from both hosting and participating in the tournament.

The following groups were drawn at the 15th AFF Council meeting in Singapore on 16 June 2015.

Venue

Group stage
Times listed are UTC+7.

Group A

Group B

Knockout stage

Semi-finals

Third place match

Final

Winner

Goalscorers 
12 goals

 Daniel Fogarty
 Jetsada Chudech

11 goals

 Suphawut Thueanklang

8 goals

 Jarrod Basger
 Kritsada Wongkaeo
 Manuel Sa Sarmento

7 goals

 Ahmad Fawzul Hadzir Mohamad

6 goals

 Dean Lockhart
 Saiful Nizam Mohd Ali
 Trần Văn Vũ

5 goals

 Htet Myat Naing
 Lê Quốc Nam

4 goals

 Adam Cooper
 Nathan Niski
 Faiz Hasnan
 Khampha Phiphakkhavong
 Muhamad Fitri Yatim
 Nattawut Madyalan
 Sorasak Phoonjungreed
 José Vide
 Dương Anh Tùng
 Ngô Ngọc Sơn
 Nguyễn Bảo Quân
 Nguyễn Minh Trí

3 goals

 Shervin Keshavarz Adeli
 Wade Giovenali
 Faizul Jefry Zaini
 Inpan Keomanixay
 Soulichanh Phasawaeng
 Aung Aung
 Khin Zaw Lin
 Naing Ye Kyaw
 Nyein Min Soe
 Pyae Phyo Maung
 Wanlop Pansomsuay
 Warut Wangsama-Aeo
 Phạm Đức Hòa
 Phùng Trọng Luân
 Trần Long Vũ
 Vũ Xuân Du

2 goals

 Glen Kelshaw
 Gregory Giovenali
 Azizan Roslan
 Nidnilanh Chanchaleune
 Aizad Daniel
 Akmarulnizam Idris
 Mohd Khairul Effendy Mohd Bahrin
 Muhammad Akmal Yazadh Amri
 Saiful Aula Ahmad
 Kyaw Soe Moe
 Pasilan Floriano Jr Sevilla
 Amir Zalani
 Jirawat Sornwichian
 Piyapan Rattana
 Machel Antonio Fernandes Alves Carvalho
 Danh Phát
 Mai Thành Đạt

1 goal

 Jonathan Barrientos
 Tobias Seeto
 Maziri Maidin
 Chiu Nonmany
 Khitsakhone Champathong
 Khounsombath Phommaxay
 Kita Souksabai
 Oley Bousa Ath
 Aung Zin Oo
 Pyae Phyo Maung
 Ye Yint Oo
 Mabanag Michael Jerremy
 Lorenzo Hermosa
 Mohamed Farhan Farook
 Mohamad Helmi
 Ampol Srirageaw
 Chaiwat Jamgrajang
 Konghla Lekka
 Piyanat Nusaya
 Lourenco B. Guterres
 Remigio Duarte Lopes da Silva

1 own goal

 Yamin Haji Muhammad 
 Panida Sinthapaseuth 
 Suvannahong Bunliyong 
 Manuel Yuhico 
 Yi Long 
 Ivan Alves

Teams qualified 
Per statistical convention in football, matches decided in extra time are counted as wins and losses, while matches decided by penalty shoot-out are counted as draws.

References

External links
 Old website (Archived)
 Official website

AFF Futsal Championship
Futsal
Futsal
International futsal competitions hosted by Thailand
AFF